Kinnaris Quintet is a Scottish folk band, founded in 2017, whose music is influenced by Scottish and Irish traditional music, bluegrass and classical. The group takes its name from the south-east Asian mythological creature, the Kinnaris, renowned for its dance, song and poetry. In 2019 they won the Belhaven Bursary for Innovation in Scottish Music.

Membership
Jenn Butterworth – guitar
Aileen Reid (formerly Aileen Reid Gobbi) – 5-string fiddle
Fiona MacAskill – fiddle
Laura-Beth Salter – mandolin
Laura Wilkie – fiddle

History
The members of the group knew each other from playing in the same sessions and meeting each other at gigs. In 2017, Reid invited Wilkie, MacAskill, Salter and Butterworth to her flat to jam and they agreed to form the group. In 2017, Salter and Butterworth released an album together, Bound, under their own names and, in 2018, Kinnaris Quintet released their debut album, Free One. 
Free One was longlisted for the 2019 Scottish Album of the Year Award.
Their second album This Too was released in 2022.

Discography
Free One (2018)
This Too (2022)

References

External links 
 
 
 Laura-Beth Salter homepage
 Laura Wilkie homepage

Scottish folk music groups
Celtic fusion groups
Musical groups established in 2017
2017 establishments in Scotland